Gorna Oryahovitsa Airport  is an international airport near Veliko Tarnovo, Bulgaria. It is used predominantly for cargo, as the last regular passenger flights to Sofia were abolished in the end of the last decade. The airport is believed to have very good prospective, because of its situation in the centre of the country, the lack of big airports nearby, and the huge number of tourists in the area coming from abroad, but unfortunately it is the most undeveloped of the five international airports in Bulgaria.

History
The airport is established in 1925 and was originally used primarily by Bulgarian Air Force. In 1948 is opened a regular civil air route to Sofia, the third such in the country. The current track was completed in 1973 and has concrete construction, asphalt in 1982. In 1978, completed a new terminal and administration building, and in 1994, a new building for air traffic management. During the 1970s and 1980s, Balkan Airlines operated regular flights to Sofia and Varna. In 1995, they became an international airport and it is open border and customs post. In 2002, the government decided to start a concession for the airport. By November 2011, there were three concession procedures ran by the government but they still can't find an operator for the airport.

In 2016, the airport was concessioned for 35 years after a decision by the Bulgarian government. The airport was sold to "Gorna Oryahovitsa Airport", in which two Bulgarian companies hold the shares.

Overview
The airport has been equipped with a high intensity light system – First Category, for landing and taking off in conditions of poor visibility. There is a 5 stand apron that can accommodate large airplanes: Boeing 737, An-12, IL-76 and A 320.

Although there are no scheduled flights to and from the airport, there is a small number of charters and business jets using it. The charter flights are mainly used from football teams, which are playing with PFC Litex Lovech in the Lovech town which is 80 km farther from the airport. Until 2002, the airport was used by the Bulgarian division of Ideal Standard as cargo hub for its Bulgarian production, but ceased operations due to changes in logistics. In 2011, the airport had 68 cargo flights with 19 tons of cargo.
According to the Civil Aviation Administration in Bulgaria, in 2011, the passenger traffic at GOZ was 562 passengers and 1,351 airfreight movements.

Statistics

Airlines and destinations 
As of 2023, there are no scheduled services to and from Gorna Oryahovitsa Airport.

References

External links 
 
 Gorna.bg Informational portal for municipality of Gorna Oryahovitsa (Bulgarian)
 Veliko Turnovo information tourist portal information and multimedia on Gorna airport Bulgaria 

Airports in Bulgaria
Gorna Oryahovitsa
Buildings and structures in Veliko Tarnovo Province